The 24th Cannes Film Festival was held from 12 to 27 May 1971. The Palme d'Or went to The Go-Between by Joseph Losey.

The festival opened with Gimme Shelter, a documentary about English rock band The Rolling Stones directed by David Maysles, Albert Maysles and Charlotte Zwerin and closed with Les mariés de l'an II, directed by Jean-Paul Rappeneau. The festival paid tribute to Charlie Chaplin and honored him with the title of  Commander of the national order of the Legion of Honor.

Jury 
The following people were appointed as the Jury of the 1971 film competition:

Feature films
Michèle Morgan (France) Jury President
Pierre Billard (France)
Michael Birkett (UK)
Anselmo Duarte (Brazil)
István Gaál (Hungary)
Sergio Leone (Italy)
Aleksandar Petrović (Yugoslavia)
Maurice Rheims (France)
Erich Segal (USA)
Short films
Véra Volmane (France) (journalist) President
Charles Duvanel (Switzerland)
Etienne Novella (France)

Official selection

In competition – Feature film
The following feature films competed for the Grand Prix International du Festival:

Apokal by Paul Anczykowski
Between Miracles (Per grazia ricevuta) by Nino Manfredi
The Boat on the Grass (Le Bateau sur l'herbe) by Gérard Brach
La califfa by Alberto Bevilacqua
Death in Venice (Morte a Venezia) by Luchino Visconti
Drive, He Said by Jack Nicholson
Family Life (Życie rodzinne) by Krzysztof Zanussi
The Flight (Beg) by Aleksandr Alov and Vladimir Naumov
The Go-Between by Joseph Losey
Goya, a Story of Solitude (Goya, historia de una soledad) by Nino Quevedo
Joe Hill by Bo Widerberg
Johnny Got His Gun by Dalton Trumbo
Loot by Silvio Narizzano
Love (Szerelem) by Károly Makk
The Married Couple of the Year Two (Les mariés de l'an II) by Jean-Paul Rappeneau
Mira by Fons Rademakers
Murmur of the Heart (Le souffle au cœur) by Louis Malle
The Panic in Needle Park by Jerry Schatzberg
Pindorama by Arnaldo Jabor
Raphael, or The Debauched One (Raphaël ou le débauché) by Michel Deville
Sacco & Vanzetti (Sacco e Vanzetti) by Giuliano Montaldo
Sick Animals (Animale bolnave) by Nicolae Breban
A Soul to Devils (Yami no naka no chimimoryo) by Kō Nakahira
Taking Off by Miloš Forman
Wake in Fright by Ted Kotcheff
Walkabout by Nicolas Roeg

Films out of competition
The following films were selected to be screened out of competition:

 Le Chasseur by François Reichenbach
 The Deadly Trap (La Maison sous les Arbres) by René Clément
 The Friends (Les amis) by Gérard Blain
 Gimme Shelter by David Maysles, Albert Maysles, Charlotte Zwerin
 The Hellstrom Chronicle by Walon Green
 Narcissus by Peter Foldes
 The Sacred Fire (Le feu sacré) by Vladimir Forgency
 The Trojan Women by Michael Cacoyannis

Short film competition
The following short films competed for the Short Film Palme d'Or:

 Astronaut Coffee Break by Edward Casazza
 Centinelas del silencio by Robert Amram
 Fair Play by Bronislaw Zeman
 Hans Hartrung by Christian Ferlet
 I mari della mia fantasia by Ernesto G. Laura
 Jardin by Claude Champion
 La fin du jeu by Renaud Walter
 Le coeur renverse by Maurice Frydland
 Memorial by James Allen
 Mixed-Double by Bent Barfod
 Patchwork by Georges Schwizgebel, Claude Luyet, Daniel Suter, Manolo Otero, Gérald Poussin
 Paul Delvaux, ou les femmes défendues by Henri Storck
 Star Spangled Banner by Roger Flint
 Stuiter by Jan Oonk
 Une statuette by Carlos Vilardebo

Parallel sections

International Critics' Week
The following feature films were screened for the 10th International Critics' Week (10e Semaine de la Critique):

 Breathing Together: Revolution of the Electric Family by Morley Markson (Canada)
 Bronco Bullfrog by Barney Platts-Mills (United Kingdom)
 Expédition punitive by Magyar Dessö (Hungary)
 Ich liebe dich, ich töte dich by Uwe Brandner (West Germany)
 Loving Memory by Tony Scott (United Kingdom)
 A Matter of Life (Question de vie) by André Théberge (Canada)
 Le Moindre geste by Jean-Pierre Daniel, Fernand Deligny (France)
 Les Passagers by Annie Tresgot (Algeria)
 Trash by Paul Morrissey (United States)
 Viva la muerte by Fernando Arrabal (Tunisia, France)

Directors' Fortnight
The following films were screened for the 1971 Directors' Fortnight (Quinzaine des Réalizateurs):

 A Fable by Al Freeman Jr. (United States)
 Are You Afraid? (Er i bange?) (doc.) by Henning Carlsen (Denmark)
 Badou Boy by Djibril Diop Mambety (Senegal)
 Bang Bang by Andréa Tonacci (Brazil)
 Birds, Orphans and Fools (Vtáčkovia, siroty a blázni) by Juraj Jakubisko (France, Czechoslovakia)
 Bröder Carl by Susan Sontag (Sweden)
 The Ceremony (Gishiki) by Nagisa Oshima (Japan)
 Cleopatra by Michel Auder (United States)
 The Cow (Gāv) by Dariush Mehrjui (Iran)
 Cuadecuc, vampir by Pere Portabella (Spain)
 Don't Deliver Us from Evil (Mais ne nous délivrez pas du mal) by Joël Séria (France)
 Du Cote D'Orouet by Jacques Rozier (France)
 Dziura w ziemi by Andrzej Kondratiuk (Poland)
 Agnus dei (Égi bárány) by Miklós Jancsó (Hungary)
 Equinox (Equinozio) by Maurizio Ponzi (Italy)
 Fata Morgana by Werner Herzog (West Germany)
 Festival panafricain d'Alger 1969 (doc.) by William Klein (Algeria)
 La fin des Pyrénées by Jean-Pierre Lajournade (France)
 Four Nights of a Dreamer (Quatre nuits d'un rêveur) by Robert Bresson (France)
 Goin' Down the Road by Donald Shebib (Canada)
 How Tasty Was My Little Frenchman (Como era gostoso o meu francês) by Nelson Pereira Dos Santos (Brazil)
 It Is Necessary to Be Among the Peoples of the World to Know Them (Faut aller parmi l'monde pour le savoir) by Fernand Dansereau (Canada)
 Lea in Winter (Léa l'hiver) by Marc Monnet (France)
  by George Moorse (West Germany)
 The Machine by A. Shermann, J. Rozenberg (Switzerland)
 Le Maître du temps (doc.) by Jean-Daniel Pollet (France)
 Makin' It by Simon Hartog (United Kingdom)
 Mare's Tail by David Larcher (United Kingdom)
 Mathias Kneissl by Reinhard Hauff (West Germany)
 México, la revolución congelada by Raymundo Gleyzer (Argentina)
 O Capitão Bandeira Contra o Dr. Moura Brasil (Moi, Schizo) by Antônio Calmon (Brazil)
 Ni vainqueurs, ni vaincus by A. Cabado, N. Spoliansky (Argentina)
 Of Gods and the Undead (Os Deuses e os Mortos) by Ruy Guerra (Brazil)
 The Past That Lives by Philo Bregstein (Netherlands)
 Prea mic pentru un razboi atît de mare by Radu Gabrea (Romania)
 Puntos suspensivos o Esperando a los bárbaros by Edgardo Cozarinsky (Argentina)
 Rape (Voldtekt) by Anja Breien (Norway)
 The Salamander (La salamandre) by Alain Tanner (Switzerland, France)
 Sex Jack (Seikozu) by Kōji Wakamatsu (Japan)
 Staféta by András Kovács (Hungary)
 The Sudden Wealth of the Poor People of Kombach (Der plötzliche Reichtum der armen Leute von Kombach) by Volker Schlöndorff (West Germany)
 Los testigos by Charles Elsesser (Chile)
 Those Damned Savages (Les maudits sauvages) by Jean Pierre Lefebvre (Canada)
 THX 1138 by George Lucas (United States)
 Tokyo senso sengo hiwa by Nagisa Oshima (Japan)
 Umut by Yılmaz Güney (Turkey)
 Valparaiso, Valparaiso by Pascal Aubier (France)
 Voto mas fusil by Helvio Soto (Chile)
 W.R. - Misterije organizma by Dušan Makavejev (Yugoslavia)
 Wanda by Barbara Loden (United States)

Short films

 Apotheosis by John Lennon, Yoko Ono (United Kingdom)
 Cannes, 70... by Jean-Paul Jaud (France)
 Essai à la mille by Jean-Claude Labrecque (Canada)
 Estado de sitio by Jaime Chávarri (Spain)
 Grumes by Jean-Pierre Bonneau (France)
 Habitude by Dan Wolman (Israel)
 La belleza by Arturo Ripstein (Mexico)
 La Pierre qui flotte by Jean-Jacques Andrien (Belgium)
 Le Cri by Paul Dopff (France)
 Le Vampire de la Cinémathèque by Roland Lethem (Belgium)
 Le voyage du Lieutenant Le Bihan by László Szabó (France)
 Les bulles du cardinal by Ody Roos (Luxembourg)
 Meatdaze by Jeff Keen (United Kingdom)
 Mégalodrame by Alain Colas (France)
 Moment by Stephen Dwoskin (United Kingdom)
 Monangambeee by Sarah Maldoror (Angola)
 Mortem by Adam Schmedes (Denmark)
 Okasareta hakui by Kōji Wakamatsu (Japan)
 Please Don't Stand On My Sunshine by Ned McCann (Australia)
 R.S.V.P. by W. Pinkston, J. Mason V. (United States)
 Rosée Du Matin by Jean Dasque (France)
 Sex by David Avidan (Israel)
 Sur les traces de Baal by Abdellatif Ben Ammar (Tunisia)
 Underground Again by Laure Guggenheim (France)
 Venceremos] by Pedro Chaskel (Chile)
 Viva Cariri by Geraldo Sarno (Brazil)

Awards

Official awards
The following films and people received the 1971 Official selection awards:
Grand Prix du Festival International du Film: The Go-Between by Joseph Losey
Grand Prix Spécial du Jury:
Johnny Got His Gun by Dalton Trumbo
Taking Off by Miloš Forman
Best Actress: Kitty Winn for The Panic in Needle Park
Best Actor: Riccardo Cucciolla for Sacco e Vanzetti
Jury Prize:
Joe Hill by Bo Widerberg
Szerelem by Károly Makk
Best First Work: Between Miracles (Per grazia ricevuta) by Nino Manfredi 
25th Anniversary Prize: Death in Venice (Morte a Venezia) by Luchino Visconti (also for his whole work)
Short films
Prix spécial du Jury: Star Spangled Banner by Roger Flint
Special mention (or Jury Prize):
Stuiter by Jan Oonk
Une Statuette by Carlos Vilardebó

Independent awards
FIPRESCI
FIPRESCI Prize: Johnny Got His Gun by Dalton Trumbo
Commission Supérieure Technique
Technical Grand Prize: The Hellstrom Chronicle by Walon Green 
OCIC Award
 Szerelem by Károly Makk 
Other awards
Special Mention: Lili Darvas and Mari Törőcsik, the lead actresses in Szerelem

References

Media
INA: 25th Cannes Film Festival (commentary in French)
INA: Michèle Morgan, president of the 1971 jury (commentary in French)
INA: About the film The Go-Between by Joseph Losey (interview in French and English)

External links 
1971 Cannes Film Festival (web.archive)
Official website Retrospective 1971 
Cannes Film Festival Awards for 1971 at Internet Movie Database

Cannes Film Festival, 1971
Cannes Film Festival, 1971
Cannes Film Festival